Joseph N. Gagliano is an entrepreneur, former investment advisor, and author of the book, “No Grey Areas”.

At age of 24, he organized and financed the multi-million dollar Arizona State basketball point shaving scandal in 1993–94, which led to several prison sentences and the ending of multiple careers. According to the Bleacher Report, it remains as one of the largest known scandals in sports history until this day.

Early life
Gagliano grew up on the Northwest Side of Chicago and was raised in an Italian - American family. He went to Catholic grade school and an all-boys Catholic high school. He is the son of a Chicago police officer and housewife.

While attending college at Eastern Illinois University, Gagliano started a real estate business and opened up a campus restaurant called Joey's Place.  The restaurant opened in 1987, and delivered hot dogs, beef sandwiches, and pizzas on campus. Joey's Place opened in the same center and timeframe as the original Jimmy John's in Charleston, Illinois.

At 23 years old, he started working as a clerk at the Chicago Board of Trade to eventually trading his own account in the Bond futures trading pit.

Career
In 1994, Gagliano orchestrated the ASU point shaving scheme, one of the nation's worst sports gambling scandals. He fixed the outcome of three of the ASU games in the 1993–1994 season and was able to collect more than $5 million by placing bets on the games. Gagliano tried to fix a fourth game and was caught when his operation attracted the attention of the FBI, Nevada Gaming Commission and U.S. Attorney's offices.

In 1997 he pleaded guilty to conspiracy to commit sports bribery and admitted his involvement in the point shaving scheme. He was sentenced to 15 months in prison, three years parole and 100 hours of community service, and he was fined $6,000.

In late 1998, before his prison sentence began, Gagliano opened his first of many Shammy Man Car Washes. Before going to prison, he proceeded to open a second location on the West side of Phoenix as well. By 2005 he owned, operated and controlled over 15 full-service car Wash sites in the Phoenix metropolitan area and grossed over $50 million annually in sales.

Personal life
In 2016, Gagliano published ‘No Grey Areas’. Gagliano now lives in Arizona with his family.

Current Projects
In the fall of 2021, Netflix released the documentary series “Bad Sport”. The episode titled “Hoop Schemes”tells the dramatic story of the 1994 ASU basketball point shaving scandal involving Gagliano and several ASU players. Currently, a compelling movie, based on Joseph Gagliano’s remarkable true-life journey as told in his book No Grey Areas, is being written by Lewis Colick, produced by Eric and Jodi Hannah and executive produced by Joseph Gagliano. This feature film’s release will be the catalytic kickoff for the Ambassadors of Compassion Million Student PLUS+ initiative. Joe Gagliano has also launched the No Grey Areas Podcastswhich are motivating and informative interviews covering topics such as leadership, habits, and character. The goal of the podcast is to help people live “on purpose for a purpose” and to begin promoting the future No Grey Areas movie as well as the Ambassadors of Compassion Million Student PLUS+ initiative.

Gagliano has also founded the Operation JOY Foundation which will provide resources to organizations worldwide to find solutions for the hurt, suffering and injustices in the world today. Focused primarily on children in need, Operation JOY looks to make a difference in this world.

References 

Living people
Arizona State Sun Devils men's basketball
Sportspeople involved in betting scandals
Year of birth missing (living people)